Rhabdophis leonardi,  Leonard's  keelback, is a keelback snake in the family Colubridae found in Myanmar, Laos, and China.

References

Rhabdophis
Snakes of Southeast Asia
Reptiles of Myanmar
Reptiles of Laos
Reptiles of China
Reptiles described in 1923
Taxa named by Frank Wall